is a Japanese manga series written by Naoki Yamakawa and illustrated by Masashi Asaki. It has been serialized in Kodansha's seinen manga magazine Weekly Young Magazine since May 2017, with its chapters collected in 19 tankōbon volumes as of January 2023. An anime television series adaptation produced by Tezuka Productions is set to premiere in April 2023.

Characters

Media

Manga
My Home Hero, written by Naoki Yamakawa and illustrated by Masashi Asaki, began in Kodansha's seinen manga magazine Weekly Young Magazine on May 29, 2017. In February 2021, it was announced that the series would reach its climax. Kodansha has collected its chapters into individual tankōbon volumes. The first volume was released on September 6, 2017. As of January 6, 2023, nineteen volumes have been released.

The manga is licensed in France by Kurokawa, in Spain by ECC Ediciones, and in North America by Kodansha USA.

Volume list

Anime
An anime television series adaptation was announced on June 19, 2022. The series is produced by Tezuka Productions and directed by Takashi Kamei, with scripts written by Kōhei Kiyasu, character designs by Masatsune Noguchi, and music composed by Kenji Kawai. It is set to premiere on April 2, 2023, on Tokyo MX and BS NTV. Crunchyroll licensed the series outside of Asia.

Reception
As of June 2022, the manga had over 2 million copies in circulation.

Erwan Lafleuriel of IGN France called the first volume of My Home Hero a "very effective thriller" and compared its premise to the American television series Breaking Bad.

See also
 I'm Standing on a Million Lives, another manga series written by Naoki Yamakawa

References

External links
  
  
 

2023 anime television series debuts
Anime series based on manga
Crunchyroll anime
Kodansha manga
Seinen manga
Suspense anime and manga
Tezuka Productions
Upcoming anime television series
Yakuza in anime and manga